Almost a Gentleman may refer to:

 Almost a Gentleman (1938 film), a 1938 British comedy film directed by Oswald Mitchell
 Almost a Gentleman (1939 film), a 1939 American drama film directed by Leslie Goodwins